The Decker Building (also the Union Building) is a commercial building located at 33 Union Square West in Manhattan, New York City. The structure was completed in 1892 for the Decker Brothers piano company, and designed by John H. Edelmann. From 1968 to 1973, it served as the location of the artist Andy Warhol's studio, The Factory. The Decker Building was designated a New York City landmark in 1988, and was added to the National Register of Historic Places in 2003.

Description
It has a right of way to 16th Street from the rear of the building. The style of the building mixes influences from Venice and Islamic traditions. There are numerous terra cotta details on the façade which remain today. There was a minaret on the roof which disappeared before World War II.

The building was valued at $285,000 in 1913, after which it was traded to settle debts.

History 
The structure was built in 1892 for the Decker Brothers piano company according to designs by the radical anarchist architect John H. Edelmann, working out of the offices of Alfred Zucker. It replaced the earlier Decker Building on the same lot, designed by Leopold Eidlitz and built in 1869.

On November 25, 1950, 27 year old Abraham Yeager was killed when a one-ton piece of cornice from the Decker Building collapsed onto the sidewalk where Yeager was walking.

Warhol years
In 1967, artist Andy Warhol had to move his Factory from East 47th Street due to the building being torn down. Union Square at the time was hardly an upscale neighborhood, but Paul Morrissey had found the loft, in this building, and Warhol agreed to move there. Morrissey by then had met Jed Johnson and hired him to help out with the refinishing of the space. It was around this time, or just prior, that Morrissey introduced him to Warhol.

On June 3, 1968, Valerie Solanas visited the Factory, looking for Warhol, who she felt was taking control of her screenplay away from her. She waited until Warhol returned around 4 pm. Within a few minutes, she shot Warhol three times, seriously wounding him, as well as shooting art critic and curator Mario Amaya. Solanas turned herself in to the police a few hours later.

Around 1970, Warhol built a video camera system and taped his visitors and documented the activities around the studio.

In 1973, Warhol moved the Factory to 860 Broadway, a short distance away. As part of packing up, he began to create the Warhol Time Capsules.

Refurbishment
The building was completely refurbished into apartments by Joseph Pell Lombardi in 1995. In 2015, Dylan's Candy Bar opened a ground-floor storefront in the building, which closed some time after 2019.

See also 
 Decker Brothers
 List of New York City Designated Landmarks in Manhattan from 14th to 59th Streets
 National Register of Historic Places listings in New York County, New York

References

Andy Warhol
Chelsea, Manhattan
Commercial buildings completed in 1892
New York City Designated Landmarks in Manhattan
Office buildings on the National Register of Historic Places in Manhattan
Union Square, Manhattan